Magnetic Isotope Effect
 Meta Information Encapsulation (ExifTool file format)
 Member of the Institution of Engineers, Sri Lanka
 Metal-induced embrittlement; see embrittlement
 Microsoft Internet Explorer
 Mie (singer) - a member of Japanese idol group Pink Lady.
 Mile End tube station, London (London Underground station code)
 Minimum Ignition Energy
 Minimally Invasive Education
 In toxicology, a Molecular Initiating Event or MIE sets off a chain of biological events (or adverse outcome pathway) that eventually leads to adverse effects.
 Modern Indo-European
 Mobile Internet Experience
 Muncie, IN, USA - Delaware County Airport (Airport Code)

See also
Mie (disambiguation)